Pleurothallis is a large genus that previously contained about 1240 orchids from the orchid family (Orchidaceae). , Kew's Plants of the World Online listed around 540 species in the genus.

Many species formerly classified in the genus Pleurothallis have been transferred to other genera.

Species

References

Orchid Research Newsletter issue 46 07/05 (Kew)
Reclassification of the Pleurothallidinae
The Cutting Edge Volume IX, Number 1, January 2002
Phylogenetic relationships in Pleurothallidinae (Orchidaceae): combined evidence from nuclear and plastid DNA sequences - American Journal of Botany. 2001;88:2286-2308

Pleurothallis